"Spanish Harlem" is a song recorded by Ben E. King in 1960 for Atco Records. It was written by Jerry Leiber and Phil Spector and produced by Jerry Leiber and Mike Stoller. "Spanish Harlem" was King's first hit away from The Drifters, peaking at number 15 on Billboards rhythm and blues and number 10 in pop music chart. 

The song has been covered by a number of artists including Aretha Franklin, whose version reached number two on Billboards pop chart.
The song was ranked number 358 on Rolling Stones list of the "500 Greatest Songs of All Time".

Background
Leiber credited Stoller with the arrangement in a 1968 interview; similarly, Leiber said in a 2009 radio interview with Leiber and Stoller on the Bob Edwards Weekend talk show that Stoller had written the key instrumental introduction to the record, although he was not credited. Stoller remarks in the team's autobiography Hound Dog that he had created this "fill" while doing a piano accompaniment when the song was presented to Ahmet Ertegun and Jerry Wexler at Atlantic Records, with Spector playing guitar and Leiber doing the vocal. "Since then, I've never heard the song played without that musical figure." The song was arranged by Stan Applebaum, featuring Spanish guitar, marimba, drum-beats, soprano saxophone, strings, and a male chorus.

The riff to the song was originally conceived by Spector and his then-girlfriend Beverly Ross. She was apparently shocked to discover the same riff a few months later in the version sung by King. 

Ben E. King's "Spanish Harlem" was originally released as the B-side to "First Taste of Love". "Spanish Harlem" was King's first hit away from The Drifters, a group that he had led for several years. It climbed the Billboard charts, and peaked at number 15 for rhythm and blues and number 10 in pop music.  King's version was not a hit in the United Kingdom. The song was re-released in 1987, after "Stand By Me" made number 1.

Aretha Franklin version

In July 1971, Aretha Franklin released a cover version of the song that outperformed the original on the charts and in which Franklin changed the lyrics slightly: from "A red rose up in Spanish Harlem" to "There's a rose in Black 'n Spanish Harlem. A rose in Black 'n Spanish Harlem.” Her version went to number one on the US Soul charts for three weeks and number two on the Pop charts for two weeks. "Spanish Harlem" was kept from the top spot by "Go Away Little Girl" by Donny Osmond.  This version also hit number six on Billboards Easy Listening chart. Aretha Franklin's version earned a gold single for sales of over one million. Dr. John played keyboards on Franklin's version with Bernard "Pretty" Purdie on drums and Chuck Rainey on bass.

Charts

Cliff Richard versions
Cliff Richard released his rendition on his 1962 album 32 Minutes and 17 Seconds. He also recorded a German version, titled "Das ist die Frage aller Fragen", with lyrics by Carl Ulrich Blecher, that was a number one hit in Germany and Austria in 1964, as well as a number one hit in Switzerland in 1965.

Charts

Laura Nyro version
On her 1971 covers album Gonna Take a Miracle, singer-songwriter Laura Nyro performed a version with backing vocals by the group Labelle.

References

1960 songs
1961 singles
1971 singles
Songs written by Phil Spector
Ben E. King songs
Jay and the Americans songs
The Mamas and the Papas songs
Checkmates, Ltd. songs
Aretha Franklin songs
Chet Atkins songs
Neil Diamond songs
Bowling for Soup songs
Tom Jones (singer) songs
Trini Lopez songs
Cliff Richard songs
Billy Joe Royal songs
Andy Williams songs
Cashbox number-one singles
Number-one singles in Germany
Number-one singles in Austria
Atco Records singles
Songs about New York City